Jamal James (born July 27, 1988) is an American professional boxer who held the WBA (Regular) welterweight title from 2020 to 2021.

Amateur career
As an amateur James represented Circle of Discipline boxing club in Minneapolis. In his final year as an amateur (2009), he was runner-up in two national tournaments: the National Golden Gloves and the Police Athletic League (PAL). James would have more than 150 fights as an amateur.

Professional career

James vs. Danforth 
James made his professional debut with a third-round technical knockout (TKO) win against Justin Danforth in May 2010.

Between September 2015 and December 2017 he fought six times, against opponents with a combined record of 138–13–2, winning five times. The only loss in his career so far came against 2005 amateur world champion and 2008 Olympic bronze medalist Yordenis Ugas.  

According to Boxrec.com, James was at one point the 9th ranked welterweight in the USA and 16th in the world.

James vs. DeMarco 
On July 13, 2019, James faced Antonio DeMarco in a final eliminator for the WBA interim welterweight title. James won the fight convincingly, with all three judges scoring the bout 98-92 in his favor.

James vs. Dulorme 
In his next bout, James faced Thomas Dulorme, ranked #10 by the WBA at welterweight, for the vacant WBA interim welterweight belt. James won the fight via unanimous decision, 117-111, 116-112 and 115-113 on the scorecards to win the WBA interim welterweight belt.

In February 2021, the WBA elevated James from "interim" to "World" titlist, which made James the holder of the WBA Regular welterweight belt.

James vs. Butaev 
In his first official title defence, James faced the #4 ranked Radzhab Butaev. James lost the bout via a ninth-round TKO.

Professional boxing record

References

External links

Living people
Light-welterweight boxers
Welterweight boxers
Boxers from Minnesota
American male boxers
1988 births
World Boxing Association champions
Sportspeople from Minneapolis
World welterweight boxing champions